Aleem Ford (born December 22, 1997) is an American - Puerto Rican professional basketball player for the Lakeland Magic of the NBA G League. He played college basketball for the Wisconsin Badgers.

High school career
Ford initially attended Archer High School, where he averaged 14.2 points, 6.8 rebounds and 2.2 blocks as a senior, earning All-Region 8-AAAAAA honors. He later joined IMG Academy in Florida as a post-graduate player, averaging 13.9 points and 6.3 rebounds per game.

College career
Ford redshirted his true freshman season at Wisconsin. He averaged 5.8 points and 2.8 rebounds per game as a redshirt freshman. Following the season, he underwent knee surgery. Ford averaged 3.1 points and 1.9 rebounds per game as a sophomore. He averaged 8.6 points and 4.4 rebounds per game as a junior. As a senior, Ford averaged 8.7 points, 4.2 rebounds, and 1.1 assists per game.

Professional career

Leones de Ponce (2021)
Ford began his professional career in 2021 with the Leones de Ponce of the Puerto Rican Baloncesto Superior Nacional, after being selected first in their draft. In 32 games, he averaged 7.6 points, 2.7 rebounds, 0.8 assists, 0.4 steals and 0.2 blocks per game.

Lakeland / Orlando Magic (2021–2022)
After going undrafted in the 2021 NBA draft, Ford signed with the Lakeland Magic of the NBA G League on November 4, 2021. In 12 games, he averaged 9.6 points, 4.4 rebounds and 1.3 assists in 28.1 minutes per game.

On December 17, 2021, Ford was one of four players signed to 10-day contracts by the Orlando Magic of the National Basketball Association, when the team did not have enough players to play their home game that evening due to league COVID-19 protocols. He made his NBA debut that evening, scoring 2 points and recording a steal in a 115–105 loss to the Miami Heat. On December 27, he was reacquired by Lakeland.

Return to Leones de Ponce (2022)
After the conclusion of the G League season, Ford returned to Leones de Ponce.

Return to Lakeland (2022–present)
On November 3, 2022, Ford was named to the opening night roster for the Lakeland Magic.

Career statistics

NBA

|-
| style="text-align:left;"| 
| style="text-align:left;"| Orlando
| 5 || 0 || 14.8 || .300 || .133 || — || 3.0 || .4 || .2 || .0 || 2.8
|- class="sortbottom"
| style="text-align:center;" colspan="2"| Career
| 5 || 0 || 14.8 || .300 || .133 || — || 3.0 || .4 || .2 || .0 || 2.8

Personal life
The son of Steven and Zoraya Ford, he has an older sister, Medeenah. He majored in Communication Arts.

References

External links
Wisconsin Badgers bio
College stats @ sports-reference.com

1997 births
Living people
American men's basketball players
Basketball players from Georgia (U.S. state)
IMG Academy alumni
Lakeland Magic players
Leones de Ponce basketball players
Orlando Magic players
People from Lawrenceville, Georgia
Small forwards
Undrafted National Basketball Association players
Wisconsin Badgers men's basketball players